Ibubeleye Whyte (born 9 January 1992 in Enugu, Nigeria) is a Nigeria  footballer who currently plays goalkeeper and currently plays for Rivers Angels in the Nigerian Women's Championship and the Nigeria women's national football team.

International career
Whyte made her international debut in the 2012 FIFA U-20 Women's World Cup in a 2-1 loss to Japan U-20. She was also part of the senior squads at the African Women's Championship of 2012 and the winning team of 2014. In May 2015 she was called up to be part of the team Nigeria in the 2015 FIFA Women's World Cup.

Honours

International
 Nigeria
 African Women's Championship (2): 2014,2016

References

External links
 
 

1992 births
Living people
Rivers Angels F.C. players
2015 FIFA Women's World Cup players
Women's association football midfielders
Nigerian women's footballers
Footballers from Enugu
Nigeria women's international footballers